The athletics competitions at the 2022 GCC Games took place between 16 and 19 May at the Ahmed Al Rashdan Track & Field stadium in Kuwait City.

Medal summary

Men

Women

Medal table

References

External links
 Results at Tilastopaja

GCC Games